Lezye is a village in Mginskoye Urban Settlement, Leningrad Oblast, Russia. Population:

References

Rural localities in Leningrad Oblast
Shlisselburgsky Uyezd